The Quebec City Council is the governing body in the mayor–council government in Quebec City, Quebec, Canada. The council consists of a mayor and of 21 representatives representing the 21 city council districts, with a president by borough in the elected representatives. The current council is composed of an equality of 8 Québec forte et fière councillors, led by the mayor Bruno Marchand. The main opposition party is Québec d'abord led by Claude Villeneuve, which has eight seats. Québec 21 has three seats.

Current members
Elected in the 2021 Quebec City municipal election

* Borough presidents

Former Districts/Wards

 Samuel-de-Champlain - replaced by Vieux-Québec—Montcalm
 St. Louis Ward - now Saint-Louis—Sillery District
 Saint-Roch Ward
 Saint-Charles Ward
 Saint-Pierre Ward

See also
Louis-Édouard Glackmeyer, 1833 to 1845 (St. Charles Ward), 1854 to 1856 (St. Pierre Ward)

References

External links
Current council

Municipal councils in Quebec
Municipal government of Quebec City